James Downing (1946 - 28 April 2012) was an Irish Gaelic footballer who played as a midfielder for the Cork senior team.

Born in Urhan, County Cork, Downing first played competitive football in his youth. He arrived on the inter-county scene at the age of seventeen when he first linked up with the Cork minor team, before later joining the under-21 and junior sides. He made his senior debut during the 1967 championship. Downing was a regular member of the panel for several years and won one Munster medal as a non-playing substitute. He was All-Ireland runner-up on one occasion.

At club level Downing was a one-time Munster and championship medallist with divisional side Beara. He also won numerous championship medals with Urhan.

Throughout his career Downing made just two championship appearances for Cork. He left the panel after the 1970 championship.

Honours

Team

Urhan
Cork Intermediate Football Championship (1): 1967
Cork Intermediate Football League (1): 1966
Beara Junior Football Championship (1): 1973
Kelleher Shield (1): 1961

Beara
Munster Senior Club Football Championship (1): 1967
Cork Senior Football Championship (1): 1967

Cork
Munster Senior Football Championship (1): 1967 (sub)
Munster Junior Football Championship (1): 1966
Munster Under-21 Football Championship (1): 1965
Munster Minor Football Championship (1): 1964

References

1946 births
2012 deaths
Urhan Gaelic footballers
Beara Gaelic footballers
Cork inter-county Gaelic footballers